Haut Débit Radio Régional ("regional radio broadband") is a French WiMAX service provider consortium. Members of the consortium include TDF Group (the majority shareholder), Axione and LD Collectivités, with extra investment provided by the Caisse des Dépôts et Consignations. It holds 11 of the regional licences for WiMAX spectrum in France.

See also 
 List of deployed WiMAX networks

External links 
 https://web.archive.org/web/20070912062412/http://www.tdf.fr/groupe-tdf/filiales/hdrr/
 http://www.techno-science.net/?onglet=news&news=2915
 http://www.journaldunet.com/diaporama/0611-digiworld2006-wimax/2.shtml

Internet service providers of France